Luther Allison (August 17, 1939 – August 12, 1997) was an American blues singer-songwriter and guitarist. He was born in Widener, Arkansas, although some accounts suggest his actual place of birth was Mayflower, Arkansas. Allison was interested in music as a child and during the late 1940s he toured in a family gospel group called The Southern Travellers. He moved with his family to Chicago in 1951 and attended Farragut High School where he was classmates with Muddy Waters' son. He taught himself guitar and began listening to blues extensively. Three years later he dropped out of school and began hanging around outside blues nightclubs with the hopes of being invited to perform. Allison played with the bands of Howlin' Wolf and Freddie King, taking over King's band when King toured nationally. He worked with Jimmy Dawkins, Magic Sam and Otis Rush, and also backed James Cotton. Chicago Reader has called him "the Jimi Hendrix of blues guitar".

Biography

Early life
Luther Sylvester Allison was born on August 18, 1939, in Widener, Arkansas, the fourteenth of 15 children. His family moved to Chicago when he was 12, in search of better opportunities. Several of Allison's siblings sang in a gospel group called the Southern Travellers. One of his older brothers, Ollie, soon began working as a guitarist on Chicago's booming South Side blues scene. Seeking to emulate his brother, Luther took up the guitar himself. By the middle of his teens, Allison was good enough to sit in with his brother's band on club dates.

Career
From 1954, Allison jammed with his brother's band, the Ollie Lee Allison Band. By 1957, he had formed a band with Ollie and another brother, Grant Allison, initially called The Rolling Stones, later changed to The Four Jivers, and they performed at clubs in Chicago.

Allison's big break came in 1957, when Howlin' Wolf invited him to the stage. The same year he worked briefly with Jimmy Dawkins, playing in local clubs. Freddie King took Allison under his wing, and after King got a record deal, Allison took over his gig in the house band of a club on Chicago's West Side. He worked the club circuit in the late 1950s and early 1960s. During this period, Allison moved to California for a year where he worked with Shakey Jake Harris and Sunnyland Slim. He recorded his first single in 1965. He signed a recording contract with Delmark Records in 1967 and released his debut album, Love Me Mama, the following year. He performed a well-received set at the 1969 Ann Arbor Blues Festival and as a result was asked to perform there in each of the next three years. He toured nationwide. In 1972, he signed with Motown Records, one of the few blues artists on that label. In the mid-1970s he toured Europe. He moved to France in 1977.

Allison was known for his powerful concert performances, lengthy soulful guitar solos and crowd walking with his Gibson Les Paul. He lived briefly during this period in Peoria, Illinois, where he signed with Rumble Records, releasing two live recordings, Gonna Be a Live One in Here Tonight!, produced by Bill Knight, and Power Wire Blues, produced by George Faber and Jeffrey P. Hess. Allison played the bar circuit in the United States during this period and spent eight months of the year in Europe at high-profile venues, including the Montreux Jazz Festival. In 1992, he performed with the French rock and roll star Johnny Hallyday in 18 shows in Paris, also playing during the intermission.

Allison's manager and European agent, Thomas Ruf, founded Ruf Records in 1994. Signing with Ruf Records, Allison launched a comeback in association with Alligator Records. Alligator founder Bruce Iglauer convinced Allison to return to the United States. The album Soul Fixin' Man was recorded and released in 1994, and Allison toured the United States and Canada. He won four W. C. Handy Awards in 1994. With the James Solberg Band backing him, nonstop touring and the release of Blue Streak (featuring the song "Cherry Red Wine"), Allison earned more Handy Awards and gained wider recognition. He won several Living Blues Awards and was featured on the covers of blues publications.

Illness and death

During his tour in the summer of 1997, Allison checked into a hospital on July 10, 1997 for dizziness and loss of coordination. It was discovered that he had a tumor on his lung that had metastasized to his brain. He began radiation therapy on July 16, which lasted through August 1. In and out of a coma, Allison died at around 2:30 A.M. on August 12, 1997, five days before his 58th birthday, in Madison, Wisconsin. His final album, Reckless, had just been released 5 months prior.

His son Bernard Allison, at one time a member of his band, is now a solo recording artist. Bernard, the youngest of nine siblings, was exposed to all kinds of music by his father. The younger Allison made his first venture into the music business at age 13, when he performed on a live album with his father.

Allison was posthumously inducted into the Blues Hall of Fame in 1998. In 2000, the Chicago Sun-Times called him "the Bruce Springsteen of the blues". He was a strong influence on many young blues guitarists, such as Chris Beard and Reggie Sears.

Allison is buried at Washington Memory Gardens Cemetery in Homewood, Illinois.

Discography

Studio and live albums

Compilations

Video

See also

List of blues musicians
List of Chicago blues musicians
List of electric blues musicians
List of guitarists by genre
List of notable brain tumor patients

References

External links

 
 Luther-Allison.com
 Fansite mini-biography

1939 births
1997 deaths
African-American guitarists
American blues guitarists
American male guitarists
American expatriates in France
Blues musicians from Arkansas
Deaths from lung cancer in Wisconsin
Chicago blues musicians
Delmark Records artists
Electric blues musicians
Motown artists
Musicians from Madison, Wisconsin
Musicians from Peoria, Illinois
People from St. Francis County, Arkansas
American blues singers
20th-century American guitarists
20th-century African-American male singers
Singers from Arkansas
Guitarists from Arkansas
Guitarists from Illinois
Slide guitarists
Black & Blue Records artists
Ruf Records artists
Blind Pig Records artists
Alligator Records artists